OpenOffice.org (OOo), commonly known as OpenOffice, is a discontinued open-source office suite. Active successor projects include LibreOffice (the most actively developed), Apache OpenOffice, Collabora Online (enterprise ready LibreOffice) and NeoOffice (commercial, and available only for macOS).

OpenOffice was an open-sourced version of the earlier StarOffice, which Sun Microsystems acquired in 1999 for internal use. Sun open-sourced the OpenOffice suite in July 2000 as a competitor to Microsoft Office, releasing version 1.0 on 1 May 2002.

OpenOffice included a word processor (Writer), a spreadsheet (Calc), a presentation application (Impress), a drawing application (Draw), a formula editor (Math), and a database management application (Base). Its default file format was the OpenDocument Format (ODF), an ISO/IEC standard, which originated with OpenOffice.org. It could also read a wide variety of other file formats, with particular attention to those from Microsoft Office. OpenOffice.org was primarily developed for Linux, Microsoft Windows and Solaris, and later for OS X, with ports to other operating systems. It was distributed under the GNU Lesser General Public License version 3 (LGPL); early versions were also available under the Sun Industry Standards Source License (SISSL).

In 2011, Oracle Corporation, the then-owner of Sun, announced that it would no longer offer a commercial version of the suite and donated the project to the Apache Foundation. Apache renamed the software Apache OpenOffice.

History 

OpenOffice.org originated as StarOffice, a proprietary office suite developed by German company Star Division from 1985 on. In August 1999, Star Division was acquired by Sun Microsystems for US$59.5 million, as it was supposedly cheaper than licensing Microsoft Office for 42,000 staff.

On 19 July 2000 at OSCON, Sun Microsystems announced it would make the source code of StarOffice available for download with the intention of building an open-source development community around the software and of providing a free and open alternative to Microsoft Office. The new project was known as OpenOffice.org, and the code was released as open source on 13 October 2000. The first public preview release was Milestone Build 638c, released in October 2001 (which quickly achieved 1 million downloads); the final release of OpenOffice.org 1.0 was on 1 May 2002.

OpenOffice.org became the standard office suite on many Linux distros and spawned many derivative versions. It quickly became noteworthy competition to Microsoft Office, achieving 14% penetration in the large enterprise market by 2004.

The OpenOffice.org XML file format – XML in a ZIP archive, easily machine-processable – was intended by Sun to become a standard interchange format for office documents, to replace the different binary formats for each application that had been usual until then. Sun submitted the format to the Organization for the Advancement of Structured Information Standards (OASIS) in 2002 and it was adapted to form the OpenDocument standard in 2005, which was ratified as ISO 26300 in 2006. It was made OpenOffice.org's native format from version 2 on. Many governments and other organisations adopted OpenDocument, particularly given there was a free implementation of it readily available.

Development of OpenOffice.org was sponsored primarily by Sun Microsystems, which used the code as the basis for subsequent versions of StarOffice. Developers who wished to contribute code were required to sign a Contributor Agreement granting joint ownership of any contributions to Sun (and then Oracle), in support of the StarOffice business model. This was controversial for many years. An alternative Public Documentation Licence (PDL) was also offered for documentation not intended for inclusion or integration into the project code base.

After acquiring Sun in January 2010, Oracle Corporation continued developing OpenOffice.org and StarOffice, which it renamed Oracle Open Office, though with a reduction in assigned developers. Oracle's lack of activity on or visible commitment to OpenOffice.org had also been noted by industry observers. In September 2010, the majority of outside OpenOffice.org developers left the project, due to concerns over Sun and then Oracle's management of the project and Oracle's handling of its open source portfolio in general, to form The Document Foundation (TDF). TDF released the fork LibreOffice in January 2011, which most Linux distributions soon moved to. In April 2011, Oracle stopped development of OpenOffice.org and fired the remaining Star Division development team. Its reasons for doing so were not disclosed; some speculate that it was due to the loss of mindshare with much of the community moving to LibreOffice while others suggest it was a commercial decision.

In June 2011, Oracle contributed the trademarks to the Apache Software Foundation. It also contributed Oracle-owned code to Apache for relicensing under the Apache License, at the suggestion of IBM (to whom Oracle had contractual obligations concerning the code), as IBM did not want the code put under a copyleft license. This code drop formed the basis for the Apache OpenOffice project.

Governance 
During Sun's sponsorship, the OpenOffice.org project was governed by the Community Council, comprising OpenOffice.org community members. The Community Council suggested project goals and coordinated with producers of derivatives on long-term development planning issues.

Both Sun and Oracle are claimed to have made decisions without consulting the Council or in contravention to the council's recommendations, leading to the majority of outside developers leaving for LibreOffice. Oracle demanded in October 2010 that all Council members involved with the Document Foundation step down, leaving the Community Council composed only of Oracle employees.

Naming 
The project and software were informally referred to as OpenOffice since the Sun release, but since this term is a trademark held by Open Office Automatisering in Benelux since 1999, OpenOffice.org was its formal name.

Due to a similar trademark issue (a Rio de Janeiro company that owned that trademark in Brazil), the Brazilian Portuguese version of the suite was distributed under the name BrOffice.org from 2004, with BrOffice.Org being the name of the associated local nonprofit from 2006. (BrOffice.org moved to LibreOffice in December 2010.)

Features 
OpenOffice.org 1.0 was launched under the following mission statement:

Components 

The suite contained no personal information manager, email client or calendar application analogous to Microsoft Outlook, despite one having been present in StarOffice 5.2. Such functionality was frequently requested. The OpenOffice.org Groupware project, intended to replace Outlook and Microsoft Exchange Server, spun off in 2003 as OpenGroupware.org, which is now SOGo. The project considered bundling Mozilla Thunderbird and Mozilla Lightning for OpenOffice.org 3.0.

Supported operating systems 
The last version, 3.4 Beta 1, was available for IA-32 versions of Windows 2000 Service Pack 2 or later, Linux (IA-32 and x64), Solaris and OS X 10.4 or later, and the SPARC version of Solaris.

The latest versions of OpenOffice.org on other operating systems were:
 IRIX (MIPS IV): v1.0.3
 Linux 2.2: v2.x
 Linux 2.4: v3.3.x
 Mac OS X v10.2: v1.1.2
 Mac OS X v10.3: v2.1
 Mac OS X v10.4-Mac OS X v10.6: v4.0
 Windows 95: v1.1.5
 Windows NT 4.0 SP6: v1.1.x
 Windows 98 and Windows ME: v2.4.3
 Windows 2000 Service Pack 2 or later: v3.3.x
 Solaris 7: 1.0.x
 Solaris 8, Solaris 9: v2.x
 Solaris 10: v3.4 Beta 1

Fonts 
OpenOffice.org included OpenSymbol, DejaVu, the Liberation fonts (from 2.4) and the Gentium fonts (from 3.2). Versions up to 2.3 included the Bitstream Vera fonts. OpenOffice.org also used the default fonts of the running operating system.

Fontwork is a feature that allows users to create stylized text with special effects differing from ordinary text with the added features of gradient colour fills, shaping, letter height, and character spacing. It is similar to WordArt used by Microsoft Word.  When OpenOffice.org saved documents in Microsoft Office file format, all Fontwork was converted into WordArt.

Extensions 
From version 2.0.4, OpenOffice.org supported third-party extensions. As of April 2011, the OpenOffice Extension Repository listed more than 650 extensions. Another list was maintained by the Free Software Foundation.

OpenOffice Basic 

OpenOffice.org included OpenOffice Basic, a programming language similar to Microsoft Visual Basic for Applications (VBA). OpenOffice Basic was available in Writer, Calc and Base. OpenOffice.org also had some Microsoft VBA macro support.

Connectivity 
OpenOffice.org could interact with databases (local or remote) using ODBC (Open Database Connectivity), JDBC (Java Database Connectivity) or SDBC (StarOffice Database Connectivity).

File formats 
From Version 2.0 onward, OpenOffice.org used ISO/IEC 26300:2006 OpenDocument as its native format. Versions 2.0–2.3.0 default to the ODF 1.0 file format; versions 2.3.1–2.4.3 default to ODF 1.1; versions 3.0 onward default to ODF 1.2.

OpenOffice.org 1 used OpenOffice.org XML as its native format. This was contributed to OASIS and OpenDocument was developed from it.

OpenOffice.org also claimed support for the following formats:

Development 
OpenOffice.org converted all external formats to and from an internal XML representation.

The OpenOffice.org API was based on a component technology known as Universal Network Objects (UNO). It consisted of a wide range of interfaces defined in a CORBA-like interface description language.

Native desktop integration 
OpenOffice.org 1.0 was criticized for not having the look and feel of applications developed natively for the platforms on which it runs. Starting with version 2.0, OpenOffice.org used native widget toolkit, icons, and font-rendering libraries on GNOME, KDE and Windows.

The issue had been particularly pronounced on Mac OS X. Early versions of OpenOffice.org required the installation of X11.app or XDarwin (though the NeoOffice port supplied a native interface). Versions since 3.0 ran natively using Apple's Aqua GUI.

Use of Java 
Although originally written in C++, OpenOffice.org became increasingly reliant on the Java Runtime Environment, even including a bundled JVM. OpenOffice.org was criticized by the Free Software Foundation for its increasing dependency on Java, which was not free software.

The issue came to the fore in May 2005, when Richard Stallman appeared to call for a fork of the application in a posting on the Free Software Foundation website. OpenOffice.org adopted a development guideline that future versions of OpenOffice.org would run on free implementations of Java and fixed the issues which previously prevented OpenOffice.org 2.0 from using free-software Java implementations.

On 13 November 2006, Sun committed to releasing Java under the GNU General Public License and had released a free software Java, OpenJDK, by May 2007.

Security 
In 2006, Lt. Col. Eric Filiol of the  Laboratoire de Virologie et de Cryptologie de l'ESAT demonstrated security weaknesses, in particular within macros. In 2006, Kaspersky Lab demonstrated a proof of concept virus, "Stardust", for OpenOffice.org. This showed OpenOffice.org viruses are possible, but there is no known virus "in the wild".

As of October 2011, Secunia reported no known unpatched security flaws for the software. A vulnerability in the inherited OpenOffice.org codebase was found and fixed in LibreOffice in October 2011 and Apache OpenOffice in May 2012.

Version history

OpenOffice.org 1 

The preview, Milestone 638c, was released October 2001. OpenOffice.org 1.0 was released under both the LGPL and the SISSL for Windows, Linux and Solaris on 1 May 2002. The version for Mac OS X (with X11 interface) was released on 23 June 2003.

OpenOffice.org 1.1 introduced One-click Export to PDF, Export presentations to Flash (.SWF) and macro recording. It also allowed third-party addons.

OpenOffice.org was used in 2005 by The Guardian to illustrate what it saw as the limitations of open-source software.

OpenOffice.org 2 
Work on version 2.0 began in early 2003 with the following goals (the "Q Product Concept"): better interoperability with Microsoft Office; improved speed and lower memory usage; greater scripting capabilities; better integration, particularly with GNOME; a more usable database; digital signatures; and improved usability. It would also be the first version to default to OpenDocument. Sun released the first beta version on 4 March 2005.

On 2 September 2005, Sun announced that it was retiring SISSL to reduce license proliferation, though some press analysts felt it was so that IBM could not reuse OpenOffice.org code without contributing back. Versions after 2.0 beta 2 would use only the LGPL.

On 20 October 2005, OpenOffice.org 2.0 was released. 2.0.1 was released eight weeks later, fixing minor bugs and introducing new features. As of the 2.0.3 release, OpenOffice.org changed its release cycle from 18 months to releasing updates every three months.

The OpenOffice.org 2 series attracted considerable press attention. A PC Pro review awarded it 6 stars out of 6 and stated: "Our pick of the low-cost office suites has had a much-needed overhaul, and now battles Microsoft in terms of features, not just price." Federal Computer Week listed OpenOffice.org as one of the "5 stars of open-source products", noting in particular the importance of OpenDocument. Computerworld reported that for large government departments, migration to OpenOffice.org 2.0 cost one tenth of the price of upgrading to Microsoft Office 2007.

OpenOffice.org 3 

On 13 October 2008, version 3.0 was released, featuring the ability to import (though not export) Office Open XML documents, support for ODF 1.2, improved VBA macros, and a native interface port for OS X. It also introduced the new Start Center and upgraded to LGPL version 3 as its license.

Version 3.2 included support for PostScript-based OpenType fonts. It warned users when ODF 1.2 Extended features had been used. An improvement to the document integrity check determined if an ODF document conformed to the ODF specification and offered a repair if necessary. Calc and Writer both reduced "cold start" time by 46% compared to version 3.0. 3.2.1 was the first Oracle release.

Version 3.3, the last Oracle version, was released in January 2011. New features include an updated print form, a FindBar and interface improvements for Impress. The commercial version, Oracle Open Office 3.3 (StarOffice renamed), based on the beta, was released on 15 December 2010, as was the single release of Oracle Cloud Office (a proprietary product from an unrelated codebase).

OpenOffice.org 3.4 Beta 1 
A beta version of OpenOffice.org 3.4 was released on 12 April 2011, including new SVG import, improved ODF 1.2 support, and spreadsheet functionality.

Before the final version of OpenOffice.org 3.4 could be released, Oracle cancelled its sponsorship of development and fired the remaining Star Division development team.

Market share 
Problems arise in estimating the market share of OpenOffice.org because it could be freely distributed via download sites (including mirror sites), peer-to-peer networks, CDs, Linux distributions and so forth. The project tried to capture key adoption data in a market-share analysis, listing known distribution totals, known deployments and conversions and analyst statements and surveys.

According to Valve, as of July 2010, 14.63% of Steam users had OpenOffice.org installed on their machines.

A market-share analysis conducted by a web analytics service in 2010, based on over 200,000 Internet users, showed a wide range of adoption in different countries: 0.2% in China, 9% in the US and the UK and over 20% in Poland, the Czech Republic, and Germany.

Although Microsoft Office retained 95% of the general market — as measured by revenue — as of August 2007, OpenOffice.org and StarOffice had secured 15–20% of the business market as of 2004 and a 2010 University of Colorado at Boulder study reported that OpenOffice.org had reached a point where it had an "irreversible" installed user base and that it would continue to grow.

The project claimed more than 98 million downloads as of September 2007 and 300 million total to the release of version 3.2 in February 2010. The project claimed over one hundred million downloads for the OpenOffice.org 3 series within a year of release.

Notable users 

Large-scale users of OpenOffice.org included Singapore's Ministry of Defence, and Banco do Brasil.  OpenOffice.org was the official office suite for the French Gendarmerie.

In India, several government organizations such as ESIC, IIT Bombay, National Bank for Agriculture and Rural Development, the Supreme Court of India, ICICI Bank, and the Allahabad High Court, which use Linux, completely relied on OpenOffice.org for their administration.

In Japan, conversions from Microsoft Office to OpenOffice.org included many municipal offices: Sumoto, Hyōgo in 2004, Ninomiya, Tochigi in 2006, Aizuwakamatsu, Fukushima in 2008 (and to LibreOffice as of 2012), Shikokuchūō, Ehime in 2009, Minoh, Osaka in 2009 Toyokawa, Aichi, Fukagawa, Hokkaido and Katano, Osaka in 2010 and Ryūgasaki, Ibaraki in 2011. Corporate conversions included Assist in 2007 (and to LibreOffice on Ubuntu in 2011), Sumitomo Electric Industries in 2008 (and to LibreOffice in 2012), Toho Co., Ltd. in 2009 and Shinsei Financial Co., Ltd. in 2010. Assist also provided support services for OpenOffice.org.

Retail 
In July 2007, Everex, a division of First International Computer and the 9th-largest PC supplier in the U.S., began shipping systems preloaded with OpenOffice.org 2.2 into Wal-Mart, K-mart and Sam's Club outlets in North America.

Forks and derivative software 
A number of open source and proprietary products derive at least some code from OpenOffice.org, including AndrOpen Office, Apache OpenOffice, ChinaOffice, Co-Create Office, EuroOffice 2005, Go-oo, KaiOffice, IBM Lotus Symphony, IBM Workplace, Jambo OpenOffice (the first office suite in Swahili), LibreOffice, MagyarOffice, MultiMedia Office, MYOffice 2007, NeoOffice, NextOffice, OfficeOne, OfficeTLE, OOo4Kids, OpenOfficePL, OpenOffice.org Portable, OpenOfficeT7, OpenOffice.ux.pl, OxOffice, OxygenOffice Professional, Pladao Office, PlusOffice Mac, RedOffice, RomanianOffice, StarOffice/Oracle Open Office, SunShine Office, ThizOffice, UP Office, White Label Office, WPS Office Storm (the 2004 edition of Kingsoft Office) and 602Office.

The OpenOffice.org website also listed a large variety of complementary products, including groupware systems.

Major derivatives include:

Active

Apache OpenOffice 

In June 2011, Oracle contributed the OpenOffice.org code and trademarks to the Apache Software Foundation. The developer pool for the Apache project was proposed to be seeded by IBM employees, Linux distribution companies and public sector agencies. IBM employees did the majority of the development, including hiring ex-Star Division developers. The Apache project removed or replaced as much code as possible from OpenOffice.org 3.4 beta 1, including fonts, under licenses unacceptable to Apache and released 3.4.0 in May 2012.

The codebase for IBM's Lotus Symphony was donated to the Apache Software Foundation in 2012 and merged for Apache OpenOffice 4.0, and Symphony was deprecated in favour of Apache OpenOffice.

While the project considers itself the unbroken continuation of OpenOffice.org, others regard it as a fork, or at the least a separate project.

In October 2014, Bruce Byfield, writing for Linux Magazine, said the project had "all but stalled [possibly] due to IBM's withdrawal from the project." , the project has no release manager, and itself reports a lack of volunteer involvement and code contributions. After ongoing problems with unfixed security vulnerabilities from 2015 onward, in September 2016 the project started discussions on possibly retiring AOO.

Collabora Online 

Collabora Online has LibreOffice at its core and can be integrated into any web application. It enables collaborative real-time editing with applications for word processing documents, spreadsheets, presentations, drawing and vector graphics. It is developed by Collabora Productivity, a division of Collabora who are a commercial partner with LibreOffice's parent organisation The Document Foundation (TDF), the majority of the LibreOffice software development is done by its commercial partners, Collabora, Red Hat, CIB, and Allotropia.

LibreOffice 

Sun had stated in the original OpenOffice.org announcement in 2000 that the project would be run by a neutral foundation, and put forward a more detailed proposal in 2001. There were many calls to put this into effect over the ensuing years. On 28 September 2010, in frustration at years of perceived neglect of the codebase and community by Sun and then Oracle, members of the OpenOffice.org community announced a non-profit called The Document Foundation and a fork of OpenOffice.org named LibreOffice. Go-oo improvements were merged, and that project was retired in favour of LibreOffice. The goal was to produce a vendor-independent office suite with ODF support and without any copyright assignment requirements.

Oracle was invited to become a member of the Document Foundation and was asked to donate the OpenOffice.org brand. Oracle instead demanded that all members of the OpenOffice.org Community Council involved with the Document Foundation step down, leaving the Council composed only of Oracle employees.

Most Linux distributions promptly replaced OpenOffice.org with LibreOffice; Oracle Linux 6 also features LibreOffice rather than OpenOffice.org or Apache OpenOffice. The project rapidly accumulated developers, development effort and added features, the majority of outside OpenOffice.org developers having moved to LibreOffice. In March 2015, an LWN.net development comparison of LibreOffice with Apache OpenOffice concluded that "LibreOffice has won the battle for developer participation".

NeoOffice 

NeoOffice, an independent commercial port for Macintosh that tracked the main line of development, offered a native OS X Aqua user interface before OpenOffice.org did. Later versions are derived from Go-oo, rather than directly from OpenOffice.org. All versions from NeoOffice 3.1.1 to NeoOffice 2015 were based on OpenOffice.org 3.1.1, though latter versions included stability fixes from LibreOffice and Apache OpenOffice. NeoOffice 2017 and later versions are fully based on LibreOffice.

Discontinued

Go-oo 

The ooo-build patch set was started at Ximian in 2002, because Sun was slow to accept outside work on OpenOffice.org, even from corporate partners, and to make the build process easier on Linux. It tracked the main line of development and was not intended to constitute a fork. Most Linux distributions used, and worked together on, ooo-build.

Sun's contributions to OpenOffice.org had been declining for a number of years and some developers were unwilling to assign copyright in their work to Sun, particularly given the deal between Sun and IBM to license the code outside the LGPL. On 2 October 2007, Novell announced that ooo-build would be available as a software package called Go-oo, not merely a patch set. (The go-oo.org domain name had been in use by ooo-build as early as 2005.) Sun reacted negatively, with Simon Phipps of Sun terming it "a hostile and competitive fork". Many free software advocates worried that Go-oo was a Novell effort to incorporate Microsoft technologies, such as Office Open XML, that might be vulnerable to patent claims. However, the office suite branded "OpenOffice.org" in most Linux distributions, having previously been ooo-build, soon in fact became Go-oo.

Go-oo also encouraged outside contributions, with rules similar to those later adopted for LibreOffice. When LibreOffice forked, Go-oo was deprecated in favour of that project.

OpenOffice Novell edition was a supported version of Go-oo.

IBM Lotus Symphony 

The Workplace Managed Client in IBM Workplace 2.6 (23 January 2006) incorporated code from OpenOffice.org 1.1.4, the last version under the SISSL. This code was broken out into a separate application as Lotus Symphony (30 May 2008), with a new interface based on Eclipse. Symphony 3.0 (21 October 2010) was rebased on OpenOffice.org 3.0, with the code licensed privately from Sun. IBM's changes were donated to the Apache Software Foundation in 2012, Symphony was deprecated in favour of Apache OpenOffice and its code was merged into Apache OpenOffice 4.0.

StarOffice 

Sun used OpenOffice.org as a base for its commercial proprietary StarOffice application software, which was OpenOffice.org with some added proprietary components. Oracle bought Sun in January 2010 and quickly renamed StarOffice to Oracle Open Office. Oracle discontinued development in April 2011.

References

External links 

 

2002 software
Cross-platform free software
Formerly proprietary software
Free PDF software
Free software programmed in C++
Free software programmed in Java (programming language)
Office suites for macOS
Office suites for Windows
Open-source office suites
 
Discontinued software
Portable software
Unix software
Office suites